Uiryeong Ok clan is a Korean clan. Their Bon-gwan is in Uiryeong County, South Gyeongsang Province.

See also 
 Korean clan names of foreign origin

References

External links 
 

 
Korean clan names of Chinese origin
Ok clans